Shenae Grimes-Beech (born October 24, 1989), previously credited as Shenae Grimes, is a Canadian actress. She portrayed Annie Wilson on The CW series 90210, a spin-off of Fox's Beverly Hills, 90210. Prior to that, she had a recurring role on the television series Naturally, Sadie, and played Darcy Edwards on the CTV series Degrassi: The Next Generation for four seasons.

Early life
Grimes was born in Toronto, Ontario, on October 24, 1989. She attended Forest Hill Collegiate Institute. She interned at Toronto's Fashion Television as part of her high school education. Grimes attended City Academy, a private school for her last two years of high school.

Career

Acting
Beginning with a recurring role in 2004, Grimes became a lead character on Degrassi: The Next Generation in 2006, playing the role of Darcy Edwards. In 2008, Grimes left the series and Canada after being cast as Annie Wilson in 90210, the CW's spin-off of Beverly Hills, 90210.

She also appeared in Picture This with Ashley Tisdale and with her former Degrassi: The Next Generation co-star Lauren Collins, and then in True Confessions of a Hollywood Starlet alongside singer JoJo.

In 2009, Grimes was named one of the world's most beautiful people without makeup, by People magazine. She also appeared in a music video for rock band Our Lady Peace's single "All You Did Was Save My Life".

Grimes appears in the 2010 silent fashion short film Unzipped. She wrote and directed a 2010 music video for her song "Myself and I". She also participated in YouTuber Freddie Wong's video "Gun Size Matters". She made a cameo in the horror film Scream 4, released in April 2011.

In 2011, she traveled to Japan with her 90210 costars AnnaLynne McCord and Jessica Stroup to attend the Asia Girls Explosion (AGE) in Tokyo, after filming 90210 third-season finale. Grimes was caught up in Japan due to the events of the tsunami and earthquake. According to the actress, she was at Buddha's temple at the time when the earthquakes first occurred. Consequently, she started a campaign called "Spread The Heart" with the aim of supporting Japan by victim relief after the events of the tsunami and earthquakes. Many celebrities joined the campaign which later became a big movement.

In May 2011, during her 90210 hiatus, she took a six-week internship at Teen Vogue in New York City. She stated that working as an editor for a fashion magazine has always been her dream. In the fall of 2011, she directed a music video for Megan and Liz's original song "Are You Happy Now?" to raise awareness about anti-bullying, in partnership with DoSomething.org. In 2013, Grimes starred in the film Sugar about a runaway girl living on the streets of Venice, Los Angeles.

In 2018, Grimes began playing homicide detective Jacqueline Cooper on CTV's police drama The Detail; the role marks her first time playing an adult character.

Other projects
Grimes has graced the covers of numerous fashion magazines, including US's Nylon, Vervegirl, Saturday Night Magazine, Teen Prom and Dirrty Glam. She also modeled for Teen Vogue and Complex. She has appeared in television commercials for Coffee Crisp.

In 2014, she became the brand ambassador for the Montreal-based Annabelle Cosmetics. As the face of the cosmetics line, she appeared in print and television advertisements to promote the products. Grimes and husband Josh Beech started their own clothing line in 2014 called "Two Halves." The line featured jewelry and clothes that were sold online and at the Toronto-based boutique Jonathon + Olivia.

Personal life
Grimes began dating British model and musician Josh Beech in May 2012. In December 2012, after nine months of dating, Grimes announced that she and Beech were engaged. They were married on May 10, 2013 in Ashford, Kent, England. In May 2018, the couple announced that they were expecting their first child; their daughter was born in September 2018. Their second child, a son, was born in August 2021.

On December 20, 2019, Grimes announced on her Instagram page that she had become an American citizen, and now holds dual Canadian-American citizenship. Grimes is an atheist.

Filmography

Awards and nominations

References

External links

 

1989 births
Living people
21st-century American actresses
21st-century Canadian actresses
Actresses from Toronto
American atheists
American child actresses
American film actresses
American television actresses
Canadian atheists
Canadian child actresses
Canadian emigrants to the United States
Canadian expatriate actresses in the United States
Canadian film actresses
Canadian Screen Award winners
Canadian television actresses
Naturalized citizens of the United States